Maurice Fleury (date of birth unknown, died 1913) was a French fencer. He competed in the men's épée event at the 1900 Summer Olympics.

References

External links
 

Year of birth missing
1913 deaths
French male épée fencers
Olympic fencers of France
Fencers at the 1900 Summer Olympics
Place of birth missing
Place of death missing
Date of death missing